The WNBL Leading Scorer Award is an annual Women's National Basketball League (WNBL) statistical award given since the 1981 WNBL season.  

The Leading Scorer is determined by the player with the highest average points per game, throughout the regular season. To be eligible, players must have played in at least 50% of games played in the season. From 1981 to 2020, this award was previously known as the Top Shooter Award.

Winners

See also 
 WNBL Leading Rebounder Award
 WNBL Golden Hands Award
 WNBA Peak Performers
 WNBL Most Valuable Player Award
 All-WNBL Team

References 

Leading Scorer
Awards established in 1981